Under a Cloud may refer to:

Under a Cloud (film), 1937 British comedy film directed by George King
Under a Cloud (novel), 1916 book by Arthur Wright
"Under a Cloud", song from Quasi album Field Studies